Mieko (written: , , , , ,  or ) is a feminine Japanese given name. Notable people with the name include:

, Japanese women's basketball player
, Japanese actress
, Japanese singer
, Japanese politician
, Japanese psychiatrist
, Japanese writer
, Japanese singer and writer
, Japanese politician
, Japanese fencer
, Japanese photographer
, Japanese artist and composer
, Japanese politician

Japanese feminine given names